Bujghas  is a Syrian village located in Saraqib Nahiyah in Idlib District, Idlib.  According to the Syria Central Bureau of Statistics (CBS), Bijfas had a population of 513 in the 2004 census.

The estimated terrain elevation above sea level is 344 meters. Variant forms of spelling for Bujghāş or in other languages: Borj Khass, Borj el Hâs, Bojrhâs, Bujghāş (ar), Bojrhas, Bojrhâs, Borj Khass, Borj el Has, Borj el Hâs, Bujghas, Bujghāş.

References 

Populated places in Idlib District